Zebina unamae is a species of minute sea snail, a marine gastropod mollusk or micromollusk in the family Zebinidae.

Description
The height of the shell attains 1.9 mm.

Distribution
This species occurs in the Caribbean Sea off Yucatan, Mexico.

References

 Rolán E. (1998). A new species of Zebina (Mollusca: Rissoidae: Rissoininae) from Yucatán (Mexico). Apex, 13(4): 177-179

unamae
Gastropods described in 1998